The canton of Lisieux is an administrative division of the Calvados department, northwestern France. It was created at the French canton reorganisation which came into effect in March 2015. Its seat is in Lisieux.

It consists of the following communes:

Beuvillers
Cordebugle
Courtonne-la-Meurdrac
Courtonne-les-Deux-Églises
Glos
L'Hôtellerie
Lisieux
Marolles
Le Mesnil-Guillaume
Saint-Martin-de-la-Lieue

References

Cantons of Calvados (department)
Canton of Lisieux